Troy is a wooden roller coaster located at Toverland in Sevenum, the Netherlands. It was manufactured by American manufacturer Great Coasters International (GCI) and opened on 29 June 2007. Troy was GCI's second roller coaster in Europe, following Thunderbird at PowerPark in Finland.

Characteristics

Trains
Troy uses GCI's Millennium Flyer trains. The ride has two trains with 12 cars each. Each car seats two riders, allowing a capacity of 24 riders per train. Troy can accommodate 850 riders per hour.

Layout and statistics
The ride features several high-speed turns and hills. The ride also has a section where the train travels through the station building at high speed in the middle of the layout. One cycle of the ride lasts approximately 1 minute and 50 seconds.

Theme
Troy is themed to the story of the Trojan horse.

Rankings

Incidents

During construction on 5 March 2007, part of Troy's unfinished lift hill structure collapsed due to strong winds. No injuries were reported as a result of the collapse.

See also

Great Coasters International

References

External links
Official website (in Dutch and English)
Troy at the Roller Coaster DataBase
Troy at Coaster-Net

Roller coasters in the Netherlands